El Concierto... En Vivo (English: The Concert... In Live) is the title of the first live album released by Spanish performer Rocío Dúrcal on 28 April 1992 under the label of BMG Ariola and produced by Enrique Elizondo. The album features a selection of her greatest hits, along with two new songs never recorded before by the artist: "Mía Un Año" and "Como Amigos" written and produced by Mexican singer-songwriter Juan Gabriel. This album includes recorded duets with the guest artists to the concert Enrique Guzman and Juan Gabriel.

El Concierto... En Vivo was taped on 22 November 1991 in Mexico City during her concert made in the National Auditorium. It was made available in three formats: the first edition which includes two live audio CDs, an edition which includes two LPs and an edition which includes cassettes, released on 28 April 1992. Also it released on 2006 an exclusive edition which includes two live audio CD and a DVD and a standard DVD edition.

In the United States this album peaked at number-seven on the Billboard Latin Pop Albums and its lead single "Fue Un Placer Conocerte" peaked at number-ten on the Hot Latin Tracks. This album received the ACE Awards for Best Album of the Year, Best Concert of the Year and International Artist of the Year given by Association of Latin Entertainment Critics.

Track listing 

Disc 1 (First edition)

Disc 2 (First edition)

 CD (Second edition)

DVD

Awards 
 ACE Awards (Association of Latin Entertainment Critics) 
 Rocío Dúrcal at Paramount, according to the Association of Latin Entertainment Critics.

Charts 
 Billboard Singles

 Billboard Albums

Certifications

Credits and personnel 
Musicians
 Rocío Dúrcal – (Vocals)
 Juan Gabriel – (Vocals)
 Enrique Guzmán – (Vocals)
 Mariachi De La Ciudad de Pepe Villela
 Trio Los Soberanos
 Federico Chavez (Electric guitar)
 Rofrigo Mendoza (Bass, Guitar)
 Alberto Moreno (Synthesizer)
 David Gomez Oropeza (Piano, Synthesizer)
 Miguel Reyes (Drums)

Production
 Directed and Realized by: Enrique Elizondo and (Juan Gabriel on two songs).
 Coordination: Mariana Gómez and Edgar Ramirez.
 Musical Director: Ruben Zepeda.
 Musical Direction and Coordination: Ruben Cervantes.
 Musical Adaptation: Jesus Ferrer.
 Adaptation: Jesus Rodriguez De Hijar
 Recorded at National Auditorium of Mexico D.F.
 Producer of unreleased tracks: Juan Gabriel.
 Words and music unreleased tracks: Juan Gabriel.
 Photography: Carlos Somonte, Mariana Yazbeck.
 Label (First Edition): Ariola Records (CD) (LP) and RCA Records (Cassette) 1992.
 Label (Second Edition): Sony Music 2006.
 Distributor: BMG Music.

References

1992 live albums
Rocío Dúrcal live albums
Spanish-language live albums
Albums recorded at the Auditorio Nacional (Mexico)